Rubén Acosta can refer to:

 Rubén Acosta (footballer) (born 1968), Uruguayan football player
 Rubén Acosta (volleyball) (born 1934), Mexican sports administrator